"Kick Ass (We Are Young)" is a song by English singer Mika and Moroccan-Swedish record producer RedOne released as a single from the soundtrack to the film Kick-Ass. It was released on 2 May 2010.

Background
At the European premiere of Kick-Ass in London, Mika said:

Reception
Robert Copsey from Digital Spy gave the song four stars out of five saying the song's verses "have all the usual Mika ingredients – a handful of quirky lyrics, a dash of piano and a sprinkling of his trademark wail – and it's only when the chorus kicks in that we hear the RedOne effect." He also praised the collaboration saying it "actually works remarkably well, creating a pop stomper that's empowering, oh-so-contemporary and packed with personality". Contemporary music website Popjustice also gave the song a positive review, after what was seemingly going to be a negative one, they ended it with "Guess what – 'Kick-Ass' is also AMAZING". However, the song has also been met with some criticism, with people pointing out that the chorus is very similar, lyrically, to that of "Young" by Hollywood Undead.

Music video
The video for the single shows Mika as a helpless individual left in an alleyway after being mugged. He begins to sing and as he does, the words of empowerment in the lyrics and his finding of an issue of the "Kick-Ass" comic inspire him to run for the rooftops and wail the chorus to the sky, now dressed in a slightly more superhero version of his "original persona" outfit. As is the norm with most soundtrack singles, the video features intercut scenes from the film. It was shot at Black Island Studios, London.

Track listing
 Digital download
 "Kick Ass (We Are Young)" – 3:14
 "I See You" – 4:16
 "Blame It on the Girls" (live from the iTunes Festival 2009) – 3:27
 "Kick Ass (We Are Young)" (music video)

 CD single
 "Kick Ass (We Are Young)" (Cutmore Vocal Mix) – 5:58
 "Kick Ass (We Are Young)" (Cutmore Dub) – 6:01
 "Kick Ass (We Are Young)" (Cutmore Radio Edit) – 3:24

Chart performance
The song received very little airplay in the UK, resulting in a low peak position, but in Ireland, where it received a substantial amount of airplay, it charted at number seven. In Italy, it peaked at number five and it was certified platinum by the Federazione Industria Musicale Italiana, for digital sales exceeding 30,000 units.

Weekly charts

Year-end charts

References

2010 singles
Mika (singer) songs
RedOne songs
Songs written by Mika (singer)
Song recordings produced by RedOne
Songs written by Jodi Marr
2010 songs
Casablanca Records singles
Kick-Ass (franchise)